Parakneria tanzaniae is a species of fish in the family Kneriidae. It is endemic to Tanzania.

References

tanzaniae
Endemic fauna of Tanzania
Freshwater fish of Tanzania
Taxonomy articles created by Polbot
Fish described in 1984